Hypena jocosalis, is a moth of the family Erebidae first described by Francis Walker in 1859. It is found in Sri Lanka.

References

Moths of Asia
Moths described in 1859
jocosalis